The Pakistan Nursing Council (PNC) is a regulatory body established in 1948 by the Pakistan Nursing Council Act (1952, 1973). PNC is empowered to license nurses, midwives, lady health visitors (LHVs) and nursing auxiliaries to practice nursing throughout the country.

See also
Nursing in Pakistan

References

External links
 PNC official website

1948 establishments in Pakistan
Medical and health organisations based in Pakistan
Nursing in Pakistan
Nursing licensing organizations
Professional associations based in Pakistan
Pakistan federal departments and agencies
Government agencies established in 1948
Medical and health regulators
Organizations established in 1948